Dhruva Advisors LLP is one of the largest tax and regulatory firms in India. The firm provides consultancy and regulatory services in Tax Strategy, Tax Litigation, Mergers & Acquisitions, Tax Compliance, Transfer Pricing & International Taxation, Indirect & Corporate Taxation, etc. Dhruva Advisors has been recognized as one of the fastest-growing Tax practicing firms in India, and by August 2020, it has grown to 8 offices, 6 in India, and one each in Singapore, Dubai. The firm serves some of the biggest corporate houses in India and has established a huge client base from various sectors like Defense, Automobile, IT, FMCG, Steel, Conglomerates, etc. The firm has emerged as a key player in the Tax domain in India and is competing with some of the major firms which includes the Big 4s, Grant Thornton and BDO.

History 
Dhruva Advisors was founded by Dinesh Kanabar, Ex Deputy CEO of KPMG and Ex Deputy CEO of RSM & Co. Dhruva Advisors was started in November 2014. Four senior professionals joined Dinesh, and the first-name initials of each of the first five founders (Dinesh, Hari, Rakesh, Vishal, Ajay) were used to arrive at the name Dhruva, which also means pole star in Sanskrit. The firm's first office was Nehru Centre building in Worli which is situated Mumbai, Maharashtra.

Staff 
As of August 2020, the firm has over 300 employees and 16 partners. The partners of the firm includes some of the most reputed professionals in the industry who have held senior positions like Tax Heads and Regional Heads of the big 4 firms and other big firms.

Awards and recognition 
In 2017, Euromoney named Dhruva Advisors as the Indian Tax Firm of the Year. The firm has been recognised as one of the fastest growing Tax firm of the country and have some of the biggest businesses as their clients.

The Euromoney's International Tax Review has named Dhruva Advisors as the Tax Firm of the Year for year 2018 as well as the Tax Disputes & Litigations Firm of the year. Dhruva Advisors has received this award for the second time consecutively.

The Euromoney's International Tax Review has named 
Dhruva Advisors as the India Tax Firm of the Year 2019. With this Dhruva has achieved a hat trick of wins in 2017, 2018 and 2019 as the India Tax Firm of the Year.

The list of Awards and Recognitions are as under:

References 

Financial services companies based in Mumbai
Taxation in India
2014 establishments in Maharashtra
Indian companies established in 2014